Michael Dirck Moyer (born in 1971) is an American entrepreneur, author, adjunct lecturer at Northwestern University, and adjunct associate professor at the University of Chicago Booth School of Business. He has written eight books in support of achieving success in advanced education and business, including How to Make Colleges Want You (2008) and Slicing Pie (2012), the latter of which outlined his strategy for dividing equity in startup companies.

Moyer and his business partner Alyson Tesler were the winners of the 2003 New Venture Challenge at the University of Chicago, for which their startup, Vicarious Communications, Inc., received a $25,000 investment from the university.

Education
Moyer attended the University of Kansas, receiving a BA degree in 1995. He then studied integrated marketing communications at Northwestern University, receiving an MS degree in 1996, after which he received an MBA degree from the University of Chicago in 2004.

Business ventures
In 1992, Moyer founded Moondog, a manufacturer of outdoor clothing and accessories.
In 2003, Moyer founded Vicarious Communication, Inc., a marketing services company serving the veterinary industry. The company was funded by a $1 million angel round that included the University of Chicago.
Moyer was vice president of brand strategy at Workhorse, a startup chassis manufacturer, when it was acquired by International Truck and Engine Corporation in 2005.
The following year, Moyer co-founded Cappex.com, which helps students find the right college and was financed through a $5 million angel round.
His 2012 book Slicing Pie outlined a formula for creating fair equity splits among startup co-founders.

Bibliography

References

1971 births
Living people
American business executives
American non-fiction writers
Businesspeople from Philadelphia
Writers from Philadelphia
Northwestern University faculty